Rise Organise and Rebuild Guyana (ROAR) was an Indo-Guyanese political party in Guyana led by Ravi Dev.

History
ROAR was established as a political party in 1999, and was the first party in the country to describe itself as being ethnically-based. In the 2001 general elections it received 0.9% of the vote, winning a single seat, taken by Dev. For the 2006 elections it formed an alliance with the Guyana Action Party, which received 1.2% of the vote and won one seat.

Prior to the 2011 elections many of its members joined the Alliance for Change.

References

Defunct political parties in Guyana
1999 establishments in Guyana
Indian diaspora in Guyana
Political parties established in 1999